Costantino Lazzari (1 January 1857, Cremona – 29 December 1927, Rome) was an Italian politician. He was one of the founders and main leaders of the Italian Socialist Party.

Biography
Costantino Lazzari was born in Cremona, on 1 January 1857. He was an artisan and since his adolescence he was a member of the left-wing trade unions. In 1882 Lazzari founded (with Giuseppe Croce) the Italian Workers' Party (POI).

In 1892 with Filippo Turati and Anna Kuliscioff founded the Italian Socialist Party (PSI) at the Genoa Congress.

Lazzari was the leader of the revolutionary wing of the Socialist Party, known as Massimalisti. In 1912 he was elected Secretary of the Socialist Party and led the party in the 1913 general election, where the PSI gained 17.6% of votes, arriving second after the governing Liberal Union of Giovanni Giolitti. In 1919 Lazzari resigned as Secretary.

In 1922 he was expelled from the PSI, accused of being a close ally of the new-established Communist Party (PCdI), and for being in favor of the PSI joining the Communist International. 

After the formation of the Fascist dictatorship of Benito Mussolini, Lazzari was persecuted as a socialist and died in poverty in 1927.

References

1857 births
1927 deaths
Italian Socialist Party politicians
Italian Aventinian secessionists